is a Japanese retired judoka.

She was born in Takasago, Hyogo, and began judo at the age of 12. She entered Miki House after graduating from Tsukuba University. She was good at Seoinage and Newaza.

In 1998, she won a gold medal the World Junior Judo Championships. In 1999, she won a gold medal at the World Judo Championships and the Ippon Trophy.

She also participated in the Olympic Games in 2000 but was defeated by Celita Schutz from USA.

References

External links
 
 
 

Japanese female judoka
Olympic judoka of Japan
1980 births
People from Takasago, Hyōgo
Living people
Sportspeople from Hyōgo Prefecture
Judoka at the 2000 Summer Olympics
20th-century Japanese women
21st-century Japanese women